Chromis insolata is a species of fish in the family Pomacentridae. It is commonly known as the sunshinefish, and found in the Western Atlantic. It occasionally makes its way into the aquarium trade. It grows to a size of 16 cm in length.

References

 
 http://www.ibiologia.unam.mx/links/peces/fao/WCAidSheets/Vol%203/y4162e38.pdf

Further reading

External links

 

insolata
Fish described in 1830
Taxa named by Georges Cuvier